ICRAC may refer to:
 International Committee for Robot Arms Control
 calcium release‐activated calcium current (Icrac), see Calcium release activated channel